The suprainiac fossa is an elliptical depression on the occiput above the superior nuchal line, or inion, or a dent in the back of the head. Suprainiac fossae were common anatomical features of Neanderthals but are rare in modern Humans.

References

Further reading

Skull